Arylacetamide deacetylase-like 3 is a protein in humans that is encoded by the AADACL3 gene.

References

External links